Karaağa is a village in Anamur district of Mersin Province, Turkey. It is one of the westernmost villages of the province. The population of Karaağa is 555  as of 2011.

References

Villages in Anamur District